Amerila arthusbertrand is a moth of the subfamily Arctiinae first described by Félix Édouard Guérin-Méneville in 1830. It is found on Sulawesi in Indonesia.

References

Moths described in 1830
Amerilini
Moths of Indonesia